Black Courser is an adventure module published in 1990 for the second edition of Advanced Dungeons & Dragons fantasy role-playing game.

Plot summary
Black Courser is an adventure in which the player characters search for a lost city to obtain an artifact to free the Purple Dragon so that the characters can overcome an evil raja.

Publication history
FRA2 Black Courser was written by Troy Denning, with a cover by Brom, and was published by TSR in 1990 as a 32-page book, an 8-page booklet, and an outer folder.

Reception

Reviews

References

Forgotten Realms adventures
Role-playing game supplements introduced in 1990